This is a list of dams and reservoirs in Andalusia, Spain.

Almería

Cádiz

Córdoba

Granada

Huelva 
 Embalse de Aracena
 Embalse de Zufre
 Embalse de Andévalo
 Embalse del Chanza
 Embalse de Corumbel Bajo
 Embalse de Jarrama
 Embalse de Los Machos
 Embalse de Piedras

Jaén 
 Embalse de Aguascebas
 Embalse de Dañador
 Embalse de Giribaile
 Embalse de Guadalén
 Embalse de Guadalmena
 Embalse de Jándula
 Embalse de La Bolera
 Embalse de La Fernandina
 Embalse de Quiebrajano
 Embalse de Rumblar
 Embalse de El Tranco de Beas
 Embalse de Vadomojón
 Embalse de Vívoras
 Embalse de las Anchuricas
 Embalse de la Novia o de la Vieja

Málaga 
 Embalse de El Limonero
 Embalse de Casasola
 Embalse de Guadalteba
 Embalse de Guadalhorce
 Embalse de La Concepción
 Embalse de La Viñuela

Seville 
 Embalse de Cala
 Embalse de El Agrio
 Embalse de El Pintado
 Embalse de Gergal
 Embalse de Huesna
 Embalse de José Torán
 Embalse de La Minilla
 Embalse de Puebla de Cazalla
 Embalse de Torre del Águila

See also 
 List of dams and reservoirs
 List of dams and reservoirs in Spain

External links 

 Agencia del agua Junta de Andalucía 
 Reservoirs status summary 
 Confederación Hidrográfica del Guadalquivir